Mischievous Moon is Canadian singer-songwriter Jill Barber's fifth album, released April 5, 2011.

Track listing

References

2011 albums
Jill Barber albums